Virginia Mennonite Missions is a Anabaptist Christian mission agency headquartered in Harrisonburg, Virginia.

VMMissions was commissioned by Virginia Mennonite Conference in 1919 to help Mennonites in Virginia share the good news of Jesus Christ with their neighbors in West Virginia. Within a few decades, the ministry had extended to the Caribbean and the Mediterranean.

Today, with headquarters in Harrisonburg, Virginia, VMMissions supports 60 missionaries serving in 20 countries and sends multiple short-term teams each year, all focused on being and making disciples in the way of Christ. Ministries include evangelism and church planting, education, leadership development, children and youth ministry, deaf ministry, refugee and immigrant ministry, church revitalization and business as mission.

In addition to churches in Virginia Mennonite Conference, VMMissions serves a growing number of like-minded partners around the globe.

History
Virginia Mennonite Missions (VMMissions) was formed in 1919 to help Anabaptist Christians in Virginia share the good news of Jesus Christ with their neighbors in nearby communities. Over time, VMMissions helped to plant over 100 churches in the US, and dozens of churches in the Caribbean and Mediterranean. Today, with headquarters in Harrisonburg, Virginia, VMMissions continues to send and support mission workers from both within and beyond the Anabaptist family of churches. Ministries focus on making disciples of Jesus Christ through evangelism, church planting, leadership development, education, community development, business as mission, and other creative means of Christian witness.

Governance
VMMissions is incorporated as a charitable 501(c)(3) ministry and is governed by its own board of directors. The board includes representatives from its founding family of churches (Virginia Mennonite Conference) and other partnering churches. VMMissions is an accredited member of the Evangelical Council for Financial Accountability and the Standards of Excellence in Short-term Missions.

References

External links
Official website

Mennonitism in the United States
Christian missions